Maydan Shahr is a district in the east of Wardak Province, Afghanistan. Its population was estimated at 121,531 in 2002, consisting of about 85% Pashtuns and 14% Tajiks, with a few Hazara families. The district centre is Maydan Shahr.

References
 UNHCR District Profile, dated 2002-07-06, accessed 2006-08-14 (PDF).

External links
 Map of Maydan Shahr (PDF)

It was caught in crossfire when the Soviets invaded Afghanistan.

Districts of Maidan Wardak Province